Jimmy Connors defeated Björn Borg in the final, 6–4, 3–6, 7–6(11–9), 6–4 to win the men's singles tennis title at the 1976 US Open.

Manuel Orantes was the defending champion, but lost in the quarterfinals to Borg.

Seeds
The seeded players are listed below. Jimmy Connors is the champion; others show the round in which they were eliminated.

  Jimmy Connors (champion)
  Björn Borg (finalist)
  Guillermo Vilas (semifinalist)
  Adriano Panatta (second round)
  Ilie Năstase (semifinalist)
  Manuel Orantes (quarterfinalist)
  Arthur Ashe (second round)
  Raúl Ramírez (second round)
  Eddie Dibbs (quarterfinalist)
  Harold Solomon (first round)
  Roscoe Tanner (fourth round)
  Stan Smith (fourth round)
  Corrado Barazzutti (second round)
  Wojtek Fibak (first round)
  Brian Gottfried (fourth round)
  Vitas Gerulaitis (fourth round)

Draw

Key
 Q = Qualifier
 WC = Wild card
 LL = Lucky loser
 r = Retired

Final eight

Section 1

Section 2

Section 3

Section 4

Section 5

Section 6

Section 7

Section 8

References

External links
 Association of Tennis Professionals (ATP) – 1976 US Open Men's Singles draw
1976 US Open – Men's draws and results at the International Tennis Federation

Men's singles
US Open (tennis) by year – Men's singles